Navicula australoshetlandica is an algae species in the genus Navicula, known from inland waters of the Antarctic and Sub-Antarctic regions.

References

Further reading
Sterken, Mieke, et al. "An illustrated and annotated checklist of freshwater diatoms (Bacillariophyta) from Livingston, Signy and Beak Island (Maritime Antarctic Region)." Plant Ecology and Evolution 148.3 (2015): 431-455.
Rochera, Carlos, et al. "Community structure and photosynthetic activity of benthic biofilms from a waterfall in the maritime Antarctica." Polar biology36.12 (2013): 1709-1722.

External links

AlgaeBase

australoshetlandica
Protists described in 2011